San Francisco Seals may refer to:

San Francisco Seals (PCL), a Pacific Coast League team from 1903–1957
San Francisco Seals (collegiate baseball), a collegiate woodbat team started in 1985 currently playing in the Great West League since 2018
San Francisco Seals (ice hockey), a Western Hockey League team from 1961–1967 that entered the National Hockey League in the fall of 1967, as the California Seals
San Francisco Seals (soccer), also known as the San Francisco Bay Seals, a minor league team from 1992–2000 and 2006–2008